Boonooroo is a coastal town and locality in the Fraser Coast Region, Queensland, Australia.

Geography 
The Great Sandy Strait forms the eastern and southern boundaries.

History 
The town's name is an Aboriginal word meaning the brigalow tree (Acacia harpopylla).

Boonooroo State School opened in 1911. It closed in May 1931. On 30 September 1946 it reopened as Boonooroo Provisional School, becoming Boonooroo State School in 1960. It then closed in 1961.

References

External links 
 

Towns in Queensland
Fraser Coast Region
Coastline of Queensland
Localities in Queensland